Knitsley railway station served the hamlet of Knitsley, County Durham, England from 1862 to 1939 on the Lanchester Valley Railway.

History 
The station opened on 1 September 1862 by the North Eastern Railway. The station was situated on the west side of Butesfield Lane. In 1870 Lord Lambton, who owned the land at the time, accepted an application to search for coal and it was founded in the following year. The NER doubled the station's tracks in anticipation of the demand from collieries that may open on the line, and this did soon happen at Malton, Lanchester, Bearpark and Langley. The station closed to passengers on 1 February 1916 but later reopened on 30 March 1925. Passenger numbers were always light on the Lanchester Valley Line and it had an early close on 1 May 1939. After closure to passengers, there were still occasional excursions for Miners' Gala until 17 July 1954. Goods traffic was discontinued on 9 March 1964.

References

External links 

Disused railway stations in County Durham
Former North Eastern Railway (UK) stations
Railway stations in Great Britain opened in 1862
Railway stations in Great Britain closed in 1939
1862 establishments in England
1964 disestablishments in England